Susanne Thorson (born 12 June 1981) is a Swedish actress.

Selected filmography

External links

1981 births
Living people
Swedish film actresses
Swedish television actresses